Ian Macmillan Ward  (9 April 1928 – 5 November 2018) was a British physicist specialising in polymer science. He was Cavendish Professor of Physics in the School of Physics and Astronomy at the University of Leeds where he was also chairman of the School of Physics and Astronomy and first Director of the Polymer Interdisciplinary Research Centre.

Early life and education 
Ward was educated at the Royal Grammar School, Newcastle upon Tyne and Magdalen College, Oxford.

Career 
Ward joined the Fibres division of the Imperial Chemical Industries as Technical Officer in 1954. Following a secondment to the Division of Applied Mathematics of Brown University (1961–1962), he became the Head of the Basic Physics Section at the company. In 1965, he joined the University of Leeds as a Lecturer in Physics of Materials, becoming a Professor of Physics in 1970 and Cavendish Professor in 1989, before retiring in 1994. He chaired the Department of Physics at Leeds from 1975 until 1978 and from 1987 until 1989. He served as the president of the British Society of Rheology from 1984 until 1986. In 1989, he became the first Director of the Polymer Interdisciplinary Research Centre, holding the position until 1994.  Ward was also a visiting Professor at the University of Bradford.

He published 700 peer-reviewed journal articles, 6 textbooks and 20 major patents. He served as Editor of the journal Polymer published by Elsevier. He was managing director of several University of Leeds spin-off companies. These include Vantage Polymers for single polymer self-reinforced composites, die-drawn ropes and tubes, and Leeds Lithium Power for thermoreversible, ionically conducting polymer gel electrolytes used to manufacture lithium batteries.

Awards and honours 
Ward received awards from the Institute of Physics: Charles Vernon Boys Medal (1993), Glazebrook Medal (2004) – and the Institute of Materials: Griffith Medal (1982), Swinburne Medal (1988) and the Netlon Award (2004). In 1993, he received a honorary doctorate from the University of Bradford.

He was elected a Fellow of the Royal Society (FRS) in 1983. His certificate of election reads: 

The Ian Macmillan Ward Prize for the Best Student Publication, awarded every two years to PhD students by the Institute of Physics Polymer Physics Group, is named in his honour.  

In 2013, the Department of Materials of ETH Zurich awarded him the Staudinger–Durrer Prize in recognition of his pioneering contributions to the field of mechanical properties of solid polymers and polymer-based composites.

Major works

References 

1928 births
2018 deaths
British physicists
Fellows of the Institute of Physics
Fellows of the Royal Society
Academics of the University of Leeds
Alumni of Magdalen College, Oxford
People educated at the Royal Grammar School, Newcastle upon Tyne
Imperial Chemical Industries people